The year 1648 in music involved some significant events.

Events 
 End of the Thirty Years' War (1618–1648), which had disrupted German cultural development during much of the first half of the 17th century.
July 1 – Ambrosius Reiner is appointed Kapellmeister at the court of Innsbruck, succeeding his father-in-law Johann Stadlmayr
December 6 – The marriage of Count Maximilian Willibald of Waldburg-Wolfegg and Clara Isabella Princess of Aarschot and Arenberg is celebrated with a performance of Bartholomäus Aich's musical-dramatic festival play .
 Alexis of Russia's 1648 law "About the correction of morals and the destruction of superstitions" (Об исправлении нравов и уничтожении суеверий) has banned all the secular music in Russia. It ordered to publicly burn all the folk instruments and those performers who disagree had to be physically punished and deported to Malorossia (modern Ukraine).

Publications 
 Johann Rudolph Ahle – 
 Manuel Cardoso –  (Lisbon: João Rodrigues for Laurenco Craebeck)
 Francesco Corbetta – , published in Brussels
Chiara Margarita Cozzolani –  (Venice)
 Marco Dionigi –  (Parma; enlarged, second edition 1667)
 Giovanni Giacomo Gastoldi –  (Amsterdam: Cornelis de Leeuw) [with fourth part added by Leeuw]
 Henry Lawes – Choice Psalmes
 Teodoro Massucci –  (Rome)
 Paulus Matthysz (ed.) – 20 Koninklijcke fantasien (Amsterdam: Paulus Matthysz)
 Johann Rist –  (Hamburg), with songs by Heinrich Pape
 Heinrich Schütz –  (Spiritual Choral Music)

Classical music

Opera 
 none listed

Births 
July 9 – Arp Schnitger, German organ builder (d. 1719)
August 9 (baptized) – Johann Michael Bach, German composer (d. 1694)

Deaths 
January 9 – David Gregor Corner, German theologian, hymnologist, poet, and composer (born 1585)
July 12 – Johann Stadlmayr, German composer and organist (born c.1580)
August 20 – Edward Herbert, 1st Baron Herbert of Cherbury, English courtier, amateur lutenist, and composer (born March 3, 1582)
November 17 – Thomas Ford, English composer (born c.1580)
unknown – Michael East, English composer (born c.1580)

References

 
Music
17th century in music
Music by year